The 2017 Hobart International was a women's tennis tournament played on outdoor hard courts. It was the 24nd edition of the event and part of the WTA International tournaments of the 2017 WTA Tour. It took place at the Hobart International Tennis Centre in Hobart, Australia from 9 through 15 January 2017.

Points and prize money

Point distribution

Prize money

1 Points per the WTA.
2 Qualifiers prize money is also the Round of 32 prize money
* per team

Singles main-draw entrants

Seeds

1 Rankings as of 2 January 2017.

Other entrants
The following players received wildcards into the singles main draw:
  Lizette Cabrera
  Jaimee Fourlis
  Francesca Schiavone

The following players received entry using a protected ranking:
  Galina Voskoboeva

The following players received entry from the qualifying draw:
  Jana Fett 
  Elise Mertens 
  Risa Ozaki
  Teliana Pereira

The following players received entry as lucky losers:
  Cindy Burger
  Verónica Cepede Royg
  Nicole Gibbs
  Mandy Minella
  Kurumi Nara
  Sílvia Soler Espinosa
  Sachia Vickery

Withdrawals
Before the tournament
  Alizé Cornet (back injury) → replaced by  Cindy Burger
  Sara Errani (left thigh injury) → replaced by  Kurumi Nara
  Julia Görges (change in schedule) → replaced by  Verónica Cepede Royg
  Ana Konjuh (left toe injury) → replaced by  Mandy Minella
  Naomi Osaka (left wrist injury) → replaced by  Nicole Gibbs
  Alison Riske (change in schedule) → replaced by  Sílvia Soler Espinosa
  Kateřina Siniaková (change in schedule) → replaced by  Sachia Vickery

During the tournament
  Lesia Tsurenko

Retirements
  Sachia Vickery

Doubles main-draw entrants

Seeds

1 Rankings as of 2 January 2017.

Other entrants 
The following pairs received wildcards into the doubles main draw:
  Ashleigh Barty /  Casey Dellacqua
  Pauline Parmentier /  Francesca Schiavone

The following pairs received entry as alternates:
  Alison Bai /  Lizette Cabrera
  Jessica Moore /  Varatchaya Wongteanchai

Withdrawals 
Before the tournament
  Ashleigh Barty
  Kurumi Nara

During the tournament
  Sara Errani
  Lyudmyla Kichenok
  Abigail Spears

Champions

Singles

  Elise Mertens def.  Monica Niculescu, 6–3, 6–1

Doubles

 Raluca Olaru /  Olga Savchuk def.  Gabriela Dabrowski /  Yang Zhaoxuan, 0–6, 6–4, [10–5]

References

External links
Official website

 
Hobart International
Hobart International
Hobart International
Hobart International